Here's to the Heroes is the sixth studio album from Australian vocal group The Ten Tenors, released in August 2006.

Track listing

Charts

Weekly charts

Year-end charts

Certifications

References

2006 albums
The Ten Tenors albums
Warner Records albums